Dannett is a surname. Notable people with the surname include:

Thomas Dannett (1543–1601), English politician
Leonard Dannett (by 1530–1591), MP for Marlborough and Gatton (UK Parliament constituency)
Audley Dannett, MP for Rye (UK Parliament constituency)